Jyoti Bhushan Banerji was an Indian physician, social worker and the founder of Jyoti Institute of Medical and Rehabilitation Sciences (JIMARS) from the Indian state of Allahabad. He founded the organization in 1971, and later registered it under the name, Viklang Kendra, in 1976, for the rehabilitation of physically disabled people. The organization was renamed again as JIMARS, in 2010, upon the death of Banerji. He was honored by the Government of India, in 2001, with the fourth highest Indian civilian award of Padma Shri.

References

20th-century Indian medical doctors
Social workers
Medical doctors from Uttar Pradesh
Recipients of the Padma Shri in medicine
Scientists from Allahabad
Social workers from Uttar Pradesh
Year of birth missing
Year of death missing